Viking Aircraft may refer to :

Companies
Viking Air, an aircraft manufacturer based in North Saanich, British Columbia, Canada
Viking Aircraft Inc. a defunct aircraft manufacturer (2000-2005) that was based in Panama City Beach, Florida, United States
Viking Aircraft LLC, an aircraft manufacturer based in Elkhorn, Wisconsin, United States
Viking Airlines AB, a defunct privately owned charter airline based in Stockholm, Sweden
 FlyViking AS; a defunct Norwegian airline

Aircraft
Lockheed S-3 Viking, an American anti-submarine warfare aircraft
St Andrews Viking, a family of American powered parachutes
Vickers VC.1 Viking, a British WWII airliner
Vickers Viking, a British WWI amphibious aircraft

See also

 Viking (disambiguation)
 Viking Aircraft Viking-series
 Viking Aircraft Viking I
 Viking Aircraft Viking II